John Yetter McCollister (June 10, 1921 – November 1, 2013) was an American Republican politician.

He was born to John M. McCollister and Ruth Yetter McCollister in Iowa City, Iowa. In 1939 he graduated from Washington High School in Sioux Falls, South Dakota and in 1943 he graduated from the University of Iowa in  Iowa City. He married Nanette Stokes on August 22, 1943.

Career 
McCollister was a lieutenant in United States Naval Reserve from 1943 to 1946. From 1960 to 1971 and again from 1979 to 1986  he was president of McCollister & Co.

For two terms from 1965 to 1970, he was the Douglas County Commissioner. He was a delegate to the Nebraska State Republican conventions from 1960 to 1970, and  delegate to the 1968 Republican National Convention. He was elected as a  Republican to the Ninety-second United States Congress, defeating incumbent Glenn Cunningham in the Republican primary.  He was reelected to the  Ninety-third United States Congress and Ninety-fourth United States Congress serving from January 3, 1971 to January 3, 1977. In 1976, he decided to run instead for the U.S. Senate but was unsuccessful, losing to Omaha Mayor Edward Zorinsky by a 53% to 47% margin. He was a presidential elector for Nebraska in 2000.

Personal life 
McCollister was a resident of Omaha, Nebraska.

McCollister died of cancer in November 2013.

McCollister is the father of John S. McCollister, current state senator from district 20 in Omaha.

References

Sources
 
 
 
 

American Presbyterians
County supervisors and commissioners in Nebraska
Politicians from Iowa City, Iowa
Politicians from Sioux Falls, South Dakota
University of Iowa alumni
1921 births
2013 deaths
Deaths from cancer in Nebraska
United States Navy personnel of World War II
United States Navy officers
United States Navy reservists
Republican Party members of the United States House of Representatives from Nebraska
20th-century American politicians
Military personnel from Iowa